Lok Kalyan Marg, formerly Race Course Road, is a road in New Delhi, India. It is located south of Central Delhi. The nearest Delhi Metro station is Lok Kalyan Marg station.

This road houses both the Prime Minister of India's residence at 7, Lok Kalyan Marg and the Delhi Gymkhana, which can also be approached from Safdarjung Road. Lok Kalyan Marg is closed for public entry.

On the north-west end, it stretches from a roundabout joining Rajaji Road, Teen Murti Road, Akbar Road and Safdarjung Road. On the south-west end, it stretches up to the Mustafa Kemal Atatürk Marg, at the entry of the racecourse.

Naming
Earlier called 'Race Course Road', it was renamed 'Lok Kalyan Marg' by the New Delhi Municipal Council (NDMC) in September 2016.

See also
 Prime Minister's Office
 Lok Kalyan Marg metro station

References

External links
 Delhi Race Club, website
 Delhi Race Club at WikiMapia

Roads in Delhi